Liuzhou railway station is a railway station in Liunan District, Liuzhou, Guangxi, China.

History 

The station opened in 1941.

A new station building was completed in 2002.

On 31 December 2015, a project to rebuild and expand the station was started. On 1 March 2017, a new station building to the west of the line was opened and the old building to the east was closed. On 28 September 2019, the completed station was opened. The work saw a waiting room built across the tracks.

References 

Railway stations in Guangxi
Railway stations opened in 1941